The Swedish bandy championship final is a yearly event concluding the bandy season in Sweden and deciding the Swedish bandy champions.

From 1907 to 1930, the finalists were decided from a cup tournament and from 1931 the finalists have been decided from a play-off tournament of the top-tier of the Swedish bandy league system.

The first final was held in 1907, when IFK Uppsala beat IFK Gävle with 4–1 in Boulognerskogen, Gävle.

In 1912, two winners were declared, because no replay of the tied final could be played due to the weather.

Below is a list of finals from 1950 to 1999.

1950

1951

1952

1953

1954

1955

1956

1957

1958

1959

1960

1961

1962

1963

1964

1965

1966

1967

1968

1969

1970

1971

1972

1973

1974

1975

1976

1977

1978

1979

1980

1981

1982

1983

1984

1985

1986

1987

1988

1989

1990

1991

1992

1993

1994

1995

1996

1997

1998

1999

See also
List of Swedish bandy championship finals (1907–1949)
List of Swedish bandy championship finals (2000–)

References

Swedish bandy championship
Swedish bandy-related lists